The Candelaria Hills are a mountain range in Mineral County, Nevada.  The highest peak is Miller Mountain which was the location of "Borax" Smith's board-and-batten cabin where he lived when he discovered a rich borax deposit at nearby Teel's Marsh.

References 

Mountain ranges of Nevada
Mountain ranges of the Great Basin
Mountain ranges of Mineral County, Nevada